Jean-Guihen Queyras is a French cellist. He was born in Montreal, Quebec, Canada on 11 March 1967, and moved with his parents to Algeria when he was 5 years old; the family moved to France 3 years later. He is a professor at the Musikhochschule Freiburg and artistic co-director of the Rencontres Musicales de Haute-Provence. He won the Glenn Gould Protégé Prize in Toronto in 2002.

Queyras records for Harmonia Mundi, including: the cello concertos of Dvorak, Elgar, Ligeti, and others; the complete cello suites of both Johann Sebastian Bach and Benjamin Britten; Beethoven's complete works for cello and piano (with Alexander Melnikov); and many piano trios with Isabelle Faust and Melnikov. He is noted for his exceptionally wide range of repertoire: he has recorded cello concertos by Haydn, Monn, and Vivaldi on a period instrument with the Freiburger Barockorchester and the Akademie für Alte Musik Berlin, but also champions the music of Dallapiccola, Kurtag, Ligeti, Webern, and others.

He gave the world premieres of Ivan Fedele's cello concerto (Orchestre National de France, Leonard Slatkin) and Gilbert Amy's concerto (Tokyo Symphony Orchestra at Suntory Hall in Tokyo); in September 2005, he premiered Bruno Mantovani's concerto with the Saarbrücken Radio Sinfonie Orchestra and Phillippe Schoeller's Wind's Eyes with the SWR Sinfonieorchester Baden-Baden and Freiburg. He also gave the world premieres of Thomas Larcher's Ouroboros in 2016 and Tristan Murail's De Pays et d'Hommes Étranges (Of Strange Lands and Strange Men) in 2019.

His recordings have won distinctions such as Top CD – BBC Music Magazine, Diapason d'Or, CHOC du Monde de la Musique, 10 de Classica/Répertoire, and Editor's Choice from Gramophone.

Queyras is part of the Arcanto Quartet with Antje Weithaas, Daniel Sepec and Tabea Zimmermann. He plays a cello made in 1696 by Gioffredo Cappa.  He uses two bows: a heavier one by Thomas Gerbeth in Vienna, for 20th- and 21st-century repertoire, and a lighter Tourte.

External links
 
 Interview with Jean-Guihen Queyras for WETA 90.9 

1967 births
Living people
Musicians from Montreal
French classical cellists
French music educators
Canadian emigrants to France
City of Toronto's Glenn Gould Protégé Prize winners
20th-century French musicians
20th-century classical musicians
21st-century French musicians
21st-century classical musicians
20th-century cellists
21st-century cellists